The Maquis de l'Ain et du Haut-Jura were a group of maquis fighters in the French resistance during World War II.

On 11 November 1943, the Maquis de l'Ain et du Haut-Jura, on orders from Colonel Henri Romans-Petit, took possession of the town of Oyonnax in the Ain departement, and paraded up to the war memorial laying a wreath in the form of the croix de Lorraine with the inscription Les vainqueurs de demain à ceux de 14–18 (the conquerors of tomorrow to those of 14–18).

After a minute of silence and a rendition of the Marseillaise with the crowd, they returned to their camps in the mountains. A few weeks later, the English-speaking press published the news, which it is said managed to convince Churchill of the need to arm the French resistance. Oyonnax was rewarded for its zeal by a Médaille de la Résistance which features on its coat of arms.

External links 
 Site devoted to the Maquis de l'Ain et du Haut-Jura (French)

l'Ain et du Haut-Jura